Old Cats is a 2010 Chilean drama film directed by Sebastián Silva.

Plot 
Isidora (Bélgica Castro) and Enrique (Alejandro Sieveking) are an elderly couple living in a central apartment in Santiago. Isidora has started exhibiting symptoms of Alzheimer's disease. Their daughter, Rosario (Claudia Celedón), comes to visit them with her girlfriend, Hugo (Catalina Saavedra), leading to a series of both humorous and dramatic situations.

Cast 
 Bélgica Castro as Isadora
 Claudia Celedón as Rosario
 Catalina Saavedra as Hugo
 Alejandro Sieveking as Enrique
 Alejandro Goic as Manuel
 Alicia Rodríguez as Valentina 
  as Abeja

References

External links 

2010 drama films
2010 films
Chilean drama films
2010s Chilean films
2010s Spanish-language films